MBC 3 is a free-to-air children's channel launched on 8 December 2004, and appeals to children under the age of 15. All foreign television animated programs have been dubbed into Arabic. The channel also produces its own original programmes. It was owned by the Middle Eastern company MBC Group.

MBC 3 started airing Nickelodeon shows following the closure of Nickelodeon Arabia in 2011.  It includes Nicktoons such as T.U.F.F. Puppy, The Fairly OddParents and SpongeBob SquarePants are also present in the channel, but they are dubbed. The Nick Jr. shows include Dora the Explorer, Go Diego Go and Blue's Room. 
 
MBC 3 is known in the Middle East for censoring scenes unsuitable for Islamic audiences, such as visual romance outside of marriage, kissing before marriage scenes, awkward angles of female characters, sensual scenes between members of the opposite sex, cross-dressed men, references to alcohol and gambling, references to non-Islamic religious content and visually-grotesque scenes. However, the channel does not have a proper consensus of its censoring policy, featuring cuts that are so heavily edited it renders plot continuities inconsistent.
 
MBC 3 has separate pay-TV feeds which broadcast in Europe and the United States. They target the overseas Arab diaspora and air the same Arabic dubs as the main channel. The US feed is exclusive to Dish Network.

History 
The channel was first announced on August 28, 2004. The channel originally launched as a programming block on the main MBC 1 channel, but was also scheduled to launch as its own channel in November.

on December 2, 2004. a promo for the Channel was unveiled, revealing the channel’s branding, the promo even scheduled the channel to launch on December 8, 2004.

The channel later officially launched on 8 December 2004 at 10:00 am, the branding for the channel was designed by UK design house Turquoise who also did the MBC 1 idents.

on December 8, 2005. to celebrate its 1st anniversary, the channel was given a rebranding, along with a new mascot, a green cube named “Cubee” who later became the channel’s mascot to this day.

The channel marked its tenth anniversary on 8 December 2014.

On 18 September 2017, the channel underwent a major rebrand to a comic strip background, in which on-screen imagery featured a comic book aesthetic. This is the current era of the channel.

On 23 March 2020, MBC 3 had a major rebrand with a new logo on-screen. The new logo was just like the modern logo but the number 3 is outside the cube.

From 24 March 2020 to 22 June 2020, following the COVID-19 pandemic, MBC 3 used a logo with a house displayed on-screen and slogans  (With you at home.)

Programming

Original productions 
 Best stories (ahsan alqisas)
 Connection  (tawāṣul)
 Dania Ali Al-Hawa
 Do you know (Hal Ta'lam)
 The Science Experiment (at-tajrubah)
 Fawazeer Ramadan (fawazir ramadan) (It's also Connexion (tawāṣul), but in the Islamic month of Ramadan, it shows quizzes called Fawazeer (fawazeer) (Singular: Fawazeer (fazoorah)))
 Girl Power (banāt w bass)
 Haseeb in the World of Numbers (haseeb fi a'am al'arqam)
 Hi Tech (hai tek)
 Kingdom cities (mudun almammlakah)
 Lantern Tales (qandil alhikayat)
 Live Safari (‘īch safārī)
 Men around the prophet Muhamed SAWS (rigal hawl alrasul)
 Our friends (asdiqaʿna)
 The Parrot Learns The Hardest Quiz (babaghah yata'alam alhiga)
 Soccer Academy (sūcker akādimī)
 Soft Steps (khutuwat naʿma)
 Sweetest World Games (tisālī aḥlà ‘ālam)
 Telescope (tīlīskūb)
 Tell Me Why (gūlūlī līsh)
 Think It's Right? (fakirhā ṣaḥ?)
 Together In... (sawà fìl...)
 Sesame Street (Ahlan Simsim)
 What do you cook, Dania? (Ish ṭabikhayn ya daniya)
 Where do we go? (fein ḥanraweh)
 Little Big Stars (Nogoum Sghar)
 The Voice Kids (Ahla Sawt; Best Voice)
 Shebl Alqaseed
 H2O

Children's shows 

 64 Zoo Lane
 The 99
 The Adventures of Tintin
 The Amazing Spiez!
 Angela Anaconda
 Arthur
 Atomic Betty
 Auto-B-Good
 Avengers Assemble
 The Avengers: Earth's Mightiest Heroes
 Back to the Future
 Barney & Friends
 Being Ian
 Binka
 Bob the Builder
 BoBoiBoy Galaxy
 The Book of Pooh
 Boy Girl Dog Cat Mouse Cheese
 Braceface
 The Brothers Flub
 Bubble Bip
 Captain Biceps
 Captain Flamingo
 Carl²
 The Spooktacular New Adventures of Casper
 Chaotic
 Chloe's Closet
 Chris Colorado
 Chronokids
 Chuck's Choice
 Code Lyoko
 Combo Niños
 Commander Clark
 Corneil & Bernie
 Coach Me If You Can
 The Cramp Twins
 Cuby Zoo
 Curious George
 Cyberchase
 Danger Mouse
 Danny & Daddy
 The DaVincibles
 The Deep
 Dennis and Gnasher
 Dennis the Menace and Gnasher
 Di-Gata Defenders
 Doby & Disy
 Driver Dan's Story Train 
 Eckhart
 Egyxos
 Eliot Kid
 Exo-Squad
 Extreme Football
 Electroboy
 Fangbone!
 Fix & Foxi and Friends
 Floogals
 FloopaLoo, Where Are You?
 Flying Rhino Junior High
 Fraggle Rock
 Franny's Feet
 Fruity Robo
 Galactik Football
 Gasp!
 George of the Jungle
 Get Ace
 G.I. Joe: Renegades
 Gormiti
 Growing Up Creepie
 Handy Manny
 Hero: 108
 Hero Kids
 Higglytown Heroes
 Hot Wheels Battle Force 5 
 Hoze Houndz
 Hulk and the Agents of S.M.A.S.H.
 I.N.K. Invisible Network of Kids
 In a Galaxy Near You
 Iron Man: Armored Adventures
 Jackie Chan Adventures
 Jar Dwellers SOS
 Jimmy Two-Shoes
 Jumanji
 Jungle Junction
 The Karate Kid
 Kate & Mim-Mim
 Katie and Orbie
 Kid vs. Kat
 The Kids from Room 402
 A Kind of Magic
 Kobushi
 Kody Kapow
 Kong: The Animated Series
 Kuu Kuu Harajuku
 League of Super Evil
 The Legendaries
 Life with Louie
 Little Einsteins
 Little Princess
 Little Robots
 Littlest Pet Shop
 Lola and Virginia
 Looped
 Lucky Fred
 Mademoiselle Zazie
 Martin Mystery
 Masha and the Bear
 Max Steel
 Men in Black: The Series
 Mimi and Mr. Bobo
 Miraculous Ladybug
 Miss Spider's Sunny Patch Friends
 Mission Odyssey
 MP4orce - beyond real
 Mr. Bean
 Mr. Carton
 The Mummy
 The New Woody Woodpecker Show
 Norman Normal
 Oggy and the Cockroaches 
 Onn - Off
 Oscar's Oasis
 Osmar: The Heel of the Loaf
 The Owl
 Pablo the Little Red Fox
 Pac-Man and the Ghostly Adventures
 Paper Port
 Paprika
 Peep and the Big Wide World
 Peg + Cat
 Pigeon Boy
 The Pink Panther Show
 Pippi Longstocking
 Plankton Invasion
 Poppets Town
 PopPixie
 Postcards from Buster
 Postman Pat
 Project G.e.e.K.e.R.
 Pumpkin Reports
 Robotboy
 Rat-A-Tat
 Ratz (2004-2012)
 Rated A for Awesome Ready Jet Go! The Real Ghostbusters Regal Academy Rob the Robot RollBots Ruby Gloom Sabrina: The Animated Series Salty's Lighthouse The Save-Ums! Scary Larry Scruff The Secret Saturdays Sendokai Champions Shaun the Sheep Simsala Grimm Slugterra Snailsbury Tales Snohy The Spectacular Spider-Man Speed Racer: The Next Generation Spider-Man Spirou et Fantasio Star Wars Rebels Stella and Sam Street Football Sunny Bunnies The Super Hero Squad Show Super Robot Monkey Team Hyperforce Go! Super Wings Tara Duncan: The Evil Empress Tayo The Little Bus Team Galaxy Teenage Mutant Ninja Turtles Thomas & Friends Thunderbirds Are Go Tiny Planets The Tofus Topsy and Tim Totally Spies! Transformers: Rescue Bots Trulli Tales Turbo FAST Ultimate Spider-Man Walter Melon What's with Andy? Wheel Squad Wicked Wimzie's House WinneToons Wing Commander Academy Winston Steinburger and Sir Dudley Ding Dong Wissper W.I.T.C.H. The New Woody Woodpecker Show Wolverine and the X-Men Yakari Yin Yang Yo! Yoho Ahoy X-Men: Evolution Zaki Adventures Zevo-3 Zombie Hotel From Nickelodeon 
 All Grown Up! As Told by Ginger Back at the Barnyard Blaze and the Monster Machines Bubble Guppies Bunsen Is a Beast Butterbean's Café CatDog Catscratch ChalkZone Danny Phantom Dora the Explorer The Fairly OddParents Fanboy and Chum Chum Fresh Beat Band of Spies Go, Diego, Go! Harvey Beaks Hey Arnold! Invader Zim The Adventures of Jimmy Neutron, Boy Genius Kung Fu Panda: Legends of Awesomeness The Legend of Korra The Loud House The Mighty B! My Life as a Teenage Robot PAW Patrol The Penguins of Madagascar Rise of the Teenage Mutant Ninja Turtles Rocket Power Rusty Rivets Rugrats Shimmer and Shine SpongeBob SquarePants Sunny Day Team Umizoomi Teenage Mutant Ninja Turtles Top Wing T.U.F.F. Puppy Welcome to the Wayne The X's The Casagrandes From Disney 
 Aladdin American Dragon: Jake Long Bear in the Big Blue House Buzz Lightyear of Star Command 
 The Buzz on Maggie Dave the Barbarian Doug The Emperor's New School Even Stevens Fish Hooks House of Mouse Jake and the Never Land Pirates Kick Buttowski: Suburban Daredevil Kim Possible Lizzie McGuire Lloyd in Space Mickey Mouse Clubhouse My Friends Tigger & Pooh PB&J Otter Phineas and Ferb Quack Pack Recess The Replacements Special Agent Oso Teacher's Pet Timon & Pumbaa The Weekenders From Warner Bros. 
 Animaniacs Baby Looney Tunes The Batman Batman Batman: The Brave and the Bold Beware the Batman Duck Dodgers Freakazoid! Green Lantern Loonatics Unleashed Scooby-Doo! Mystery Incorporated Static Shock The Sylvester & Tweety Mysteries Taz-Mania Teen Titans  Teen Titans Go! The Tom and Jerry Show What's New, Scooby-Doo? Xiaolin Showdown Young Justice The Zeta Project Japanese and Korean Animation 
 Astro Boy Blue Dragon Captain Tsubasa Cyborg 009 
 Digimon Fusion Dinosaur King MegaMan NT Warrior Ōban Star-Racers Pokémon Shaman King Sonic X Spider Riders Tenkai Knights Victory Kickoff!! Yu-Gi-Oh!''

Television hosts 
 Mouhannad Bakhit
 Asalla Kamel
 Hasan Al Mulla
 Dania Shaafai
 Azza Zaarour
 Haneen Yaseen

See also
 MBC Group
 MBC 1
 MBC 2

References

External links

Mass media in the United Arab Emirates
Television stations in the United Arab Emirates
Free-to-air
Television stations in Saudi Arabia
Television channels and stations established in 2004
Arab mass media
Arabic-language television stations
Children's television networks
Middle East Broadcasting Center